Peter B. Schmidt is a Democratic member of the New Hampshire House of Representatives for Strafford County's 19th district. The 19th district includes wards one and two in Dover.

References

External links
 Biography at New Hampshire General Court

Year of birth missing (living people)
Living people
People from Dover, New Hampshire
Northwestern University alumni
Northern Illinois University alumni
New Hampshire Democrats
21st-century American politicians